Kalimuddin Shams (13 February 1939 – 4 March 2013) was an Indian politician, belonging to the All India Forward Bloc. He served as Minister for Agriculture Marketing/Food and Supply 1991–2005 in the West Bengal state government.

Shams was born in Gaya. A lawyer by profession, he became involved in organising local struggles of residents of Kidderpore outside Calcutta. He was elected to the Calcutta Municipal Corporation in 1965, standing as an independent candidate. In the following year he became a member of the All India Forward Bloc.

Shams stood as a Forward Bloc candidate in the Kabitirtha seat in the 1967 legislative assembly election, but was not elected. In 1969 he again contested municipal elections and was re-elected. He served as Mayor in Council for Water Department. In the 1972 election he again ran for legislative assembly from Kabitirtha, but was not elected.

Shams was elected to the West Bengal legislative assembly in the 1977 elections, representing Kabitirtha. He was elected as the Deputy Speaker of the assembly. He would be re-elected in 1982, 1987, 1992, 1996 and 2001 (albeit in the two last elections he represented the Nalhati constituency.

In 1980 the Urdu Academy of West Bengal was founded, with Shams as its chairman. He also served as president of the Mohammedan Sports Club several years, being appointed in 1992.

Shams was a member of the Central Committee of the All India Forward Bloc for 15 years. He resigned from his ministerial post in 2005 due to ill health.
An excellent orator, Shams was popular in India as a Muslim leader, who didn't hesitate to speak his mind and they were instances when he didn't even toe his party line when the issue concerned his community.

Kalimuddin Shams is linked to brutal killing of IPS Vinod Kumar Mehta, DCP (Port) on March 18, 1984.

References

1939 births
2013 deaths
All India Forward Bloc politicians
State cabinet ministers of West Bengal
Deputy Speakers of the West Bengal Legislative Assembly
West Bengal MLAs 1969–1971
West Bengal MLAs 1977–1982
West Bengal MLAs 1982–1987
West Bengal MLAs 1991–1996